An alarm monitoring center, central monitoring station (also known as "CMS" or wholesale central station), or alarm receiving center (also known as ARC) is a company that provides services to monitor burglar, fire, and residential alarm systems. The Central Monitoring Station may also provide watchman and supervisory services.

"It functions as a support system for critical event management devices, such as: security alarm panels, gas and temperature gauges, PERS devices, crash detection devices, integrated video systems, and even mobile applications." When a genuine alert is confirmed, the monitoring team may immediately contact the relevant emergency service.

Central monitoring stations use special telephone and mobile lines, radio channels, computers, software and trained staff to monitor their customers' security systems and call the appropriate authorities in the event an alarm signal is received. Typically, there is a monthly fee for services rendered. Because quality and experience can vary greatly among alarm companies, prospective customers are well advised to do their own research before making a final choice. Not all alarm companies monitor the systems they install and may outsource these services to another company.

Some facilities are certified by independent agencies. In the US, Underwriters Laboratories (UL) is a leader in inspection and certification of central-stations. UL Standard 827 must be adhered to in order to maintain a UL issued central-station listing. UL conducts annual audits of these listed facilities to ensure compliance.

"UL listed" companies typically offer higher levels of service and reliability because they are mandated to follow certain regulations. Higher levels of service also include range of services, and a separation from companies with conflicts of interest who may be owned or operated by entities that in fact compete with the central station's customers.

If the UL listed central station is "automated", the computers and software must meet special requirements, processing and storing very large amounts of data and integration with many different alarm protocols.

In addition, many central monitoring stations seek to become FM approved in order to demonstrate additional levels of regulation compliance and interest for customer safety.

Incoming signals are processed by digital alarm receivers; these convert the incoming event packets to serial or TCP packets which are then analysed by the Central Station software. Event packets can be communicated over any transmission medium: PSTN, GSM, radio, direct line, Ethernet, GPRS, etc.

Central Station Services 
An Alarm Monitoring Center can offer a handful of services, but the most common markets that use central station services are:

 Security and fire detection system installers 
 Personal Emergency Response System (PERS) retailers
 Devices connected to the Internet of Things. 
 Crash Detection Devices
 Integrated Security Cameras
 Lone Workers
 Environmental Monitoring (flood, gas, temperature)

Worldwide

United States 
In the United States, central stations are regulated by third-party inspection companies such as Underwriters Laboratories (UL),  FM Approvals, and The Monitoring Association (TMA). Central stations are evaluated on specific criteria such as system redundancy, building security, and regulation compliance. Once a central station has demonstrated adherence to the UL requirements, it can receive its certification.

The Monitoring Association (TMA) 
"The Monitoring Association (TMA), formerly the Central Station Alarm Association (CSAA), is an internationally-recognized non-profit trade association that represents professional monitoring companies, including those listed by a TMA-approved Nationally Recognized Testing Laboratory, such as UL, FM Global, or Intertek/ETL, as well as unlisted companies, integrators, and providers of products and services to the industry. Incorporated in 1950, TMA is legally entitled to represent its members before Congress and regulatory agencies on the local, state and federal levels, and other authorities having jurisdiction (AHJs) over the industry."

The Monitoring Association also inspects and certifies central stations with a prestigious 5 Diamond award. When a central station receives this award, it demonstrates a dedication to TMA's 5 Commitments of Excellence.

The 5 TMA Commitments are as follows:

 Commitment to random inspections and quality criteria standards by a nationally recognized testing laboratory such as FM Approvals, Intertek/ETL and UL.
 Commitment to the highest levels of customer service.
 Commitment to ongoing job-related education and testing by having 100% of its central station operators certified using the TMA online training series.
 Commitment to raising the industry standards through TMA membership and participation in its activities.
 Commitment to reducing false dispatches.

Underwriters Laboratories 
"UL works with customers and stakeholders to help them navigate market complexity. UL brings clarity and empowers trust to support the responsible development, production, marketing and purchase of the goods, solutions, and innovations of today and tomorrow."

Alarm installers are specifically regulated under UL 2050, a provision that requires installation companies to be professionally monitored by a central station that is UL certified.

Australia
In Australia, central stations are graded against Australian Standard 2201.2 which addresses two areas: physical construction and operational performance.

Physical performance is graded A, B or C (where A is the highest grading) and includes measures such as the construction of monitoring rooms – higher security monitoring centres have solid concrete and steel construction with mantraps for access that can only be operated internally.

Operational performance is graded 1, 2 or 3 (with one being the highest grading). It includes the ability of the monitoring centre to respond to events – generated by customers' security systems, operational reliability, data retrieval, etc.

Accordingly, the highest grading is A1 and the lowest is C3 however even to be graded at C3 central stations still meet very high standards. There is presently no legislative imperative for an Australian central station to be 'graded' however police may refuse to respond to alarms despatched by non-graded companies and insurers may also deny a claim where an insured customer's system was monitored by an ungraded provider.

The Australian Security Industry Association Limited (ASIAL) runs a grading scheme and publishes a list of graded monitoring centres.

United Kingdom
In the UK a similar structure of auditing takes place, with the National Approval Council for Security Systems provision of inspection and certification. Numerous standards such as BS5979 must be adhered to in order for a central station to be allowed to pass alerts to the police force. Emerging European standards are superseding these at this time.

See also
Burglar alarm
Fire alarm
Panic button alarm
Personal Emergency Response System (PERS)

Notes

Security